The Detroit Film Critics Society Award for Best Supporting Actress is an annual award given by the Detroit Film Critics Society to honor the best supporting actor that year.

Notes 
 † indicates the winner of the Academy Award for Best Supporting Actress.

Winners

2000s

2010s

2020s

References

Detroit Film Critics Society Awards
Film awards for supporting actress
Lists of films by award